Norra Vattentornet is a water tower in Örebro, Sweden that opened in 1915, and was closed in 1958. In 1988, the Svampen water tower was opened instead.

References

Buildings and structures in Örebro
1915 establishments in Sweden
1958 disestablishments in Sweden
Water towers in Sweden